The Emerald City Roller Girls (ECRG) is a roller derby league based in Eugene, Oregon.  Founded in 2007, the league once consisted of three teams, and a mixed team which competed against teams from other leagues.

Emerald City was founded in January 2007 by a group of women who had met through a knitting circle, and a posting on Craigslist.  By January 2010, the league had around 80 skaters.

The Junior Gems junior roller derby league was an offshoot of Emerald City.

References

Sports in Eugene, Oregon
Roller derby leagues established in 2007
Roller derby leagues in Oregon
2007 establishments in Oregon